The 1960 National Football League Draft in which NFL teams take turns selecting amateur college American football players and other first-time eligible players, was held at the Warwick Hotel in Philadelphia on November 30, 1959. Many players, including half of those drafted in the first round, signed with teams in the newly created American Football League, including the first overall pick and Heisman Trophy winner Billy Cannon. At the time of the draft, the Cardinals were still the Chicago Cardinals; they moved to St. Louis in March 1960. The Dallas Cowboys were enfranchised in January 1960 after the draft.

Player selections

Round one

Round two

Round three

Round four

Round five

Round six

Round seven

Round eight

Round nine

Round ten

Round eleven

Round twelve

Round thirteen

Round fourteen

Round fifteen

Round sixteen

Round seventeen

Round eighteen

Round nineteen

Round twenty

Hall of Famers
 Larry Wilson, defensive back from University of Utah taken 7th round 74th overall by the Chicago Cardinals.
Inducted: Professional Football Hall of Fame class of 1978.
 Ron Mix, offensive tackle from USC taken 1st round 10th overall by the Baltimore Colts, but signed with the Los Angeles Chargers of the AFL.
Inducted: Professional Football Hall of Fame class of 1979.
Jim Otto, center from University of Miami (Florida) signed undrafted by the Oakland Raiders of the AFL
Inducted: Professional Football Hall of Fame class of 1980
Willie Wood, safety from USC signed undrafted by Green Bay Packers
Inducted: Professional Football Hall of Fame class of 1989
Johnny Robinson, safety from LSU taken 1st round 3rd overall by the Detroit Lions, but signed with the Dallas Texans of the AFL.
Inducted: Professional Football Hall of Fame class of 2019

Notable undrafted players

See also
 1960 NFL expansion draft
 1960 American Football League draft

Notes

External links
 NFL.com – 1960 Draft
 databaseFootball.com – 1960 Draft
 Pro Football Hall of Fame

National Football League Draft
Draft
NFL Draft
1950s in Philadelphia
NFL Draft
American football in Philadelphia
Events in Philadelphia